Oscar Jackson may refer to:

 Oscar Jackson (baseball) (fl. 1887–1906), African-American baseball outfielder and first baseman
 Oscar Lawrence Jackson (1840–1920), U.S. Representative from Pennsylvania and Union Army commander
 Oscar B. Jackson Jr. (born 1947), American civil servant from the state of Oklahoma
 Oscar Jackson, former producer of the New Zealand radio show The Edge Afternoons with Guy, Sharyn & Clint